The Case of the Golden Idol is a 2022 adventure and puzzle video game developed by Color Gray Games and published by Playstack for Windows and Mac. The game depicts a narrative spanning 40 years in the 18th century, in which players collect clues to piece together concepts, characters, and evidence to provide context to the story. The Case of the Golden Idol received praise for its use of deduction to present its narrative, and has been described as a spiritual successor to Lucas Pope's 2018 game Return of the Obra Dinn. The Case of the Golden Idol was cited as one of the best games of 2022 for its narrative and design.

Gameplay

The player assumes a detective role in connecting together the details of the narrative from eleven cases, placing the player at or shortly after a static point in time where a central character in the narrative has met their death. Players resolve chapters through two modes of gameplay, with the overarching objective to correctly identify the details of the events in the chapter. 

In 'Exploring' mode, the game resembles a point and click adventure game where an environment is presented frozen at a point in time. Players are able to investigate the scene by clicking on characters, objects, or documents to collect key words of interest, such as names, places, verbs, or items, that are collected in the bottom of the screen. Whilst the events on screen are frozen in time, players are freely able to navigate between rooms, open the contents of containers, and see what items and documents a character has on their person, as well as any words that they have said.

In 'Thinking' mode, words of interest are used to piece together a narrative of what has occurred, through filling in blank slots against an incomplete description of events and characters. Parts of the 'Thinking' mode will differ depending on the chapter, in some cases requiring players to identify full names of characters, and in others specifying situational characteristics such as the titles of Brotherhood members, or the occupants of certain rooms. To assist the player, slots are completed in segments, with the player being notified when the words in that segment are either entirely correct, in which case the segment is locked in, or when the segment has more or less than two incorrect words allocated.

Plot
The Case of the Golden Idol tells the story of the titular Golden Idol, a relic with supernatural powers, as it travels over time through the hands of the Cloudsley family to the criminal underworld, esoteric secret societies and the political and aristocratic class. The game is organized into four chapters, spanning a period of fifty years. 

In 1742, Albert Cloudsley acquires the Golden Idol on an expedition after pushing his partner, Dr. Oberon Geller, off a cliff. In 1786, his descendant, Sebastian Cloudsley, dies accidentally. His will passes the Idol to a stranger to the family, Willard Wright. It is later revealed that Sebastian and Wright are members of The Brotherhood, a secret society.

The Cloudsley family conspires to return the Idol to their possession, and Willard Wright is murdered, returning the Idol to the elderly Edmund Cloudsley. The Brotherhood unsuccessfully attempts to poison Edmund, and he goes into hiding to experiment with the Idol's powers. He discovers that the Idol can transfer properties such as matter, temperature, and even age, between two objects. Ultimately, a band of thieves - led by Brotherhood cultist Walter Keene - storm Edmund's cabin, but they are subdued by a trap. 

Some time later, Walter Keene returns to the Brotherhood to endorse a new inductee, Lazarus Herst, into the cult. Lazarus hides the Idol inside a staff to perform the "miracle" of walking on air, and is crowned as their leader. Meanwhile, the other Brotherhood members successfully take out their opponents in parliament by murdering one and framing the other at a countryside salon.

Years later, the Brotherhood, restyled as the "Order Party", have taken power in the country. Citizens are ranked by virtuous behavior. Using the Idol, Lazarus takes youth away from those of low rank, and bestows it upon to those of high rank. They plan to overthrow the King, who does not recognize their authority. Before they can do so, Lazarus Herst is lured back to the Cloudsley manor by his old love, but is blasted by a cannon. Infighting erupts between the remaining Brotherhood members, and the Idol is ultimately broken. 

In the epilogue, it is revealed that, after capturing Walter Keene in the cabin, Edmund demonstrated the Idol's powers and convinced Keene to his side. Edmund faked his own death, sapped the youth from a beggar outside, and made himself young again, taking the name Lazarus Herst. He planned to use the idol to gain power and build an ideal society, uniting the threads of the game's story.

Development

The game was developed by Latvian independent developers Ernests and Andrejs Kļaviņš, who had a decade of prior experience in the game industry. The brothers founded the studio Color Gray Games in 2021, with an objective to build prototypes for their games to see if their titles could be commercially successful. The Case of the Golden Idol was developed as the first commercial venture of the studio. The developers were inspired to work on the game by the niche of "deduction games" pioneered by The Return of the Obra Dinn and Her Story, observing a "lack of games in this mould that exist," and finding appeal to "games that respect the player's time and give them agency throughout the entire process." In response, they aimed to create a game that empowered players to "feel like a detective" through the use of "gameplay and not just through narrative flavor", rather than just as a series of puzzles.

The developers made a conscious decision to pursue a pixel art style to invoke a "sense of nostalgia (for) the classic point and click adventure games of the nineties", with Andrejs Kļaviņš stating "we want(ed) to elicit a bit of nostalgia in those who grew up playing adventure games, but put a new spin on it." Citing the desire to "try something new", the developers pursued the 18th Century as a setting due to the overuse of the 19th Century, and were inspired by the art of Gustave Doré and William Hogarth as aesthetic references when illustrating the art of the game. 

The soundtrack of the game was arranged by Ukrainian composer Kyle Misko, and was released for download on Steam alongside game on 13 October 2022. Misko, who arranged the orchestral soundtrack, stated the game's soundtrack was influenced by a creative interpretation of orchestral, neoclassical, ambient and dramatic genres, and aimed to convey the mood of a detective game. The game was the first project by Misko to be released for a video game.

A demo of the game was released on Steam on 25 August 2022, in line with the Steam Next Fest event in October 2022, an event that showcases upcoming games on the platform. The full version of the game was released on 13 October 2022.

Reception

The Case of the Golden Idol received "generally positive" reviews according to review aggregator Metacritic. Critics praised the innovative and complex use of deduction to solve the puzzles in the game. Writing for The Guardian, Simon Parkin praised the game's "genuinely new and inventive forms of play" and "innovative" puzzles. Nicole Carpenter for Polygon praised the game's ability to "take the time to consider each scene in depth", and "expand past its own boundaries...leaving me thinking about its clues long after I've closed the game".
Edge praised the use of "ancillary questions to answer" across cases and the use of "misdirection and red herrings". Sam Stewart of Game Rant praised the use of a "trail of clues" across cases to lead to a "twisting mystery at the heart of the game", and the "subtle hand (the game) uses to guide players toward their solutions", noting that "players will feel like master sleuths when the pieces click."

Critics also praised the game's narrative and writing. Alexis Ong of Eurogamer praised the "neat sliver of humor" to the game and its "witty, observational writing", remarking that the game also contained a "Hogarthian flavor of political and social commentary" and "cheeky digs at the upper class disconnect with the common man." Chris Livingston of PC Gamer praised the "elaborate and intricate cases", stating "solving these murders (is) not just a fantastic series of crime-scene investigations but a highly imaginative bit of storytelling." Metro UK found the story to be "surprisingly compelling" and a "fantastic bit of interactive fiction".  

Critics were mixed on the visual presentation of the game. Metro UK noted "there's no pretending that Golden Idol isn't a fairly ugly game", although noting the game was evocative of the game's historical setting. However, Edge praised the character design as "memorably drawn" and evocative of the "ugly" personal qualities of the characters. Jay Peters of The Verge praised the game's "fantastic old-school pixel art style".

Some critics noted the complex and trial-and-error guesswork of the game had occasionally inconsistent execution. Chris Livingston of PC Gamer observed some cases required "occasionally brute-forcing the final few names or detail of a case", noting some cases "didn't entirely come together". Metro UK observed that "as each new case increases in complexity...not only do you end up with a seemingly endless number of gaps to fill in for each murder, but the motivations and explanations become increasingly obscure." Katharine Castle of Rock Paper Shotgun noted "there were a few instances where (the game's) leaps of logic went one step too far" and reached a resolution through "sheer guesswork" instead of deduction."

The game received positive comparisons to the 2018 adventure game Return of the Obra Dinn as a non-linear detective game. Edge noted that both games share a "grisly mise-en-scene" and "intelligent way it seeds clues everywhere, making oblique allusions to places and people". Katharine Castle of Rock Paper Shotgun noted the game was reminiscent of Return of the Obra Dinn in its "keen eye for detail and visual flourish", although observed the game "may not be quite as nuanced". William Hughes of AV Club felt The Case of the Golden Idol "asks players to go far more in-depth (than Obra Dinn), sacrificing its inspiration’s breadth for case-by-case depth." Commenting on the demo of the game, Lucas Pope, developer of Return of the Obra Dinn, also praised the game as having "fantastic art, great mysteries, and rewarding, methodical gameplay", a remark that was noted by the developers and subsequently used to promote the game.

Awards
The Case of the Golden Idol appeared on several year-end lists as one of the best games of 2022. IGN nominated the game as one of the "best puzzle games of 2022", as a "refreshing take on the murder mystery genre" and having "incredibly satisfying" gameplay. PC Gamer awarded the game as having the "best story" of the year, praising the "deep and fascinating story" of "the idol itself, its history and powers, and the lives of the ruthless people who would kill to possess it." Polygon, rating the game as one of the "best of 2022", stated the game "expertly supports you through the trial and error of detective work" and contained an "excellent payoff" and "epilogue". Simon Parkin of The New Yorker, also praising the game as one of the best of the year, found the game to be a "riveting detective game" and a "sophisticated, Sherlockian story about wealth and greed, delivered in a way that rewards close attention." 

The Case of the Golden Idol received an award for its narrative at IndieCade 2022. It was nominated for the Chumley's Speakeasy Award for Best Hidden Gem at the 2023 New York Game Awards. It was also nominated for "Excellence in Design" and the Seumas McNally Grand Prize at the 2023 Independent Games Festival Awards.

References

External links 
 

2022 video games
Detective video games
Indie video games
IndieCade winners
Mystery video games
Puzzle video games
Single-player video games
Video games developed in Latvia
Video games set in the 18th century
Video games set in England
Windows games